Adam Zhu is an American international investment banker and award-winning media producer known for creating and producing China-related documentaries and public affairs television. He is the chairman of Beijing Vive Sports & Entertainment Limited; Beijing Letz Wine & Spirits Limited; and Vice Chairman of the Board of Supervision of China Technology Innovation Corporation. He is Chairman of Letz Capital LLC and an investor in the Sunshine Company, a creative entertainment agency, Augustinus Bader, a German skincare brand, Mijenta Tequila, and an Italian Prosecco company Fiol. He is also a shareholder and board member of FansMall Group, China's trading cards, collectibles, and sports memorabilia company. He previously served as the Chairman of Visual China Group and board member of the China Football Association Professional League Council. 

He is the co-creator and executive producer of the TV series China's Challenges broadcast on PBS stations (2014-2019) and Voices from the Frontlines: China's War on Poverty (PBS SoCal), which was nominated for a Los Angeles Area Emmy Awards (2020) and won Telly Awards (2020) and China Television Academy Starlight award (2020). Zhu also co-created and produces Closer to China with Robert Lawrence Kuhn on China Global Television Network (CGTN), a weekly series that features China’s thought leaders and decision-makers.

Zhu is Executive Vice Chairman of The Kuhn Foundation, which supports science, philosophy, arts education, and a good relationship between the United States and China. The Foundation produced Closer To Truth, the long-running PBS/public television series on cosmo, consciousness, and meaning. For over 30 years, Zhu has worked with his long-time partner Robert Lawrence Kuhn on various China-related matters, including Kuhn's appearances in major international media.

Zhu has co-produced several books including The Man Who Changed China: The Life and Legacy of Jiang Zemin, The Inside Story of China's 30-Year Reform, and How China's Leaders Think. He has also executive-produced and produced feature films and television shows, including Never Give Up, Beauty Remains, Red Capital Wave, In Search of China, The Korean War, China From Inside, and China Visionaries. He has also served as the vice chairman of the Asia-Pacific region of IMG Group (now Endeavour Group).

He was chairman of Greater China and special advisor to the CEO of Bacardi Limited. Before joining Bacardi Limited, Zhu was Chairman and CEO of IMG Greater China and Vice Chairman of IMG Asia Pacific (2011-2015). He was a Managing Director of Investment Banking at Bank of America Merrill Lynch (2007-2011), and served as Head of Merrill Lynch's Beijing Representative Office. He also served in senior positions in the investment banking division at Citigroup.

Education
Zhu received a BA in English Literature from Xiangtan University, an MA in Applied Linguistics from Harbin Institute of Technology, and an MBA in Finance from Temple University.

Award
2020, Telly Awards for TV Programs-Cultural
China’s Challenges I, II, and III
2013, China News Awards
2015, China News Awards
2016, Emmy Awards
2017, Telly Awards for TV Cultural Programming
2018, Telly Awards for TV Cultural Programming
2018, China News Awards
Voices from the Frontlines: China's War on Poverty (PBS SoCal)
2020, Telly Awards for TV Cultural Programming
2020, Emmy Awards Nominee
2020, China Television Starlight Awards
2020, He is the co-creator and executive producer of the TV series China's Challenges broadcast on PBS stations (2014-2019), which won The 68th Los Angeles Area Emmy Awards in 2016, and Voices from the Frontlines: China's War on Poverty (PBS SoCal),which was nominated for a Los Angeles Area Emmy Awards (2020) and won Telly Awards (2020) and China Television Academy Starlight award (2020).

Personal Life

Zhu has been married to Emma Xian Qin Zhu since 2005. Together, they have three children, Aaron, Celine, and Renee. Over the years, Zhu and his wife Emma have generously supported programs to improve understanding, build good relations between the United States and China, and promote arts and culture education and exchanges.

References

Living people
1965 births